Cheungbeia kawamurai is a species of sea snail, a marine gastropod mollusk in the family Pseudomelatomidae, the turrids and allies

Description
The length of the shell attains 37.1 mm, its diameter 13.7 mm.

Distribution
This species occurs off Taiwan and off the Philippines.

References

 Habe, T. & S. Kosuge, 1966a, Shells of the world in colour, Vol. I. The tropical Pacific. vii, (2 pp. map], 193 pp., pis. 1–68, supplemental pis. 1–2; Hoikusha, Osaka
 Li B.Q., Kilburn R.N., & Li X.Z. (2010). Report on Crassispirinae Morrison, (Mollusca: Neogastropoda: Turridae) from the China Seas. Journal of Natural History. 44, 699–740

External links
 
 Image of Cheungbeia kawamurai; Li, Bao Quan, Kilburn, Richard N. and Li, Xin Zheng(2010) 'Report on Crassispirinae Morrison, 1966(Mollusca: Neogastropoda: Turridae) from the China Seas', Journal of Natural History, 44: 11, 699–740

kawamurai
Gastropods described in 1966